Wila Sirka (Aymara wila blood, red, sirka vein of the body or a mine, "red vein", also spelled Wila Sirca) is a  mountain in the Andes of Bolivia. It is located in the Oruro Department, Sebastián Pagador Province, which is identical to the Santiago de Huari Municipality. Wila Sirka lies between the mountains Azanaques in the west and Sirk'i in the east.

The river Jach'a Qala ("big stone", also spelled Jachcha Khala) originates north of the mountain. It flows to the south.

See also 
 Chullpiri

References 

Mountains of Oruro Department